Rod DeHaven (born September 21, 1966, in Palo Alto, California) is the Head Men's and Women's Cross Country Coach and Track and Field Coach at South Dakota State University (2011 to present).  SDSU is his alma mater where he holds several school records in track.

Before returning to SDSU, Rod spent time as a professional runner.  His most notable achievement is winning the 2000 Olympic Trials marathon and being the only athlete to represent the United States at the marathon at the 2000 Summer Olympics in Sydney. DeHaven is also the course record holder for the Naples Half Marathon, with a 1:03:12 time set in 2000.

International competitions

Personal bests
800 meters - 1:48.67 (1986 - SDSU School Record)
1500 meters - 3:40.15 (1987 - SDSU School Record)
8 kilometers - 22:54 (1999 Cedar Rapids)
10,000 meters- 28:17.25 (2000 Palo Alto)
Half marathon - 1:03:12 (2000 Naples FL)
Marathon - 2:11:40 (2001 Chicago)

References

1966 births
Living people
Sportspeople from Palo Alto, California
Track and field athletes from California
American male long-distance runners
American male marathon runners
Olympic track and field athletes of the United States
Athletes (track and field) at the 2000 Summer Olympics
World Athletics Championships athletes for the United States